Joseph Heath  (born 1967) is a Canadian philosopher. He is professor of philosophy at the University of Toronto, where he was formerly the director of the Centre for Ethics. He also teaches at the School of Public Policy and Governance. Heath's webpage at the University of Toronto declares his work "is all related, in one way or another, to critical social theory in the tradition of the Frankfurt School." He has published both academic and popular writings, including the bestselling The Rebel Sell.  His philosophical work includes papers and books in political philosophy, business ethics, rational choice theory, action theory, and critical theory.

He received his Bachelor of Arts from McGill University in 1990, where his teachers included Charles Taylor, and his Master of Arts and Doctor of Philosophy (1995) degrees are from Northwestern University, where he studied under Thomas A. McCarthy and Jürgen Habermas.

Heath is the recipient of the Pierre Elliott Trudeau Foundation Fellowship (2012).  In 2013, Heath was named to the Royal Society of Canada. His popular book Enlightenment 2.0 won the 2014 Shaughnessy Cohen Prize for Political Writing. In 2021 Heath published an op-ed in the Globe and Mail which argued that the acronym BIPOC is problematic in the Canadian context, suggesting instead the acronym FIVM for "Francophone, Indigenous, and Visible Minority".

Ideas
The central claim of The Rebel Sell is that counter-cultural movements have failed, and that they all share a common fatal error in the way they understand society; hence, counter-culture is not a threat to "the system". For example, it is suggested of Adbusters' Blackspot campaign that the shoe's existence proves that "no rational person could possibly believe that there is any tension between 'mainstream' and 'alternative' culture."

In the book Filthy Lucre, Joseph Heath criticizes the idea that tax-paying is inherently different from consumption, and argues that the idea of a tax freedom day is flawed:  
It would make just as much sense to declare an annual "mortgage freedom day", in order to let mortgage owners know what day they "stop working for the bank and start working for themselves". ...But who cares? Homeowners are not really "working for the bank"; they're merely financing their own consumption. After all, they're the ones living in the house, not the bank manager.

"Market failures" or "Paretian" approach to business ethics
In business ethics, Heath advances a new theory, what he calls a "market failures" or "Paretian" approach, which states that "the market is essentially a staged competition, designed to promote Pareto efficiency, and in cases where the explicit rules governing the competition are insufficient to secure the class of favoured outcomes, economic actors should respect the spirit of these rules and refrain from pursuing strategies that run contrary to the point of the competition". The approach is neither akin to the shareholder theory, the stakeholder theory or to a personal ethics framework.

Heath's market failures approach follows from his work in political economy. According to Heath, the market is not a system of natural justice. Rather, it is an imperfect but efficient institutional arrangement designed to maximize social welfare by way of an unresolved collective action problem. In other words, markets are "special-purpose institutions designed to promote efficiency", that need to be "embedded within the broader context of a welfare state, which engages in both market-complementing and redistributive policies to claim to be just."

Since these structured competitions are implemented "for the narrow reason" that, in a reasonably competitive market, they generate social benefits through positive externalities, "adversarial ethics" are acceptable in the circumscribed and limited role of markets. Indeed, economic actors engaged in market transaction "must be given a fairly broad exemption from the norms of equality or fairness".

However, they must be held accountable to the fundamental principles required to have a competitive and efficiency promoting market. Therefore, "the central role of business ethics is […] not to bring in 'outside' moral considerations to condemn the latest outrage, but to clarify and to correct the self-understanding of participants in the market economy […]. In order to do so, it has no need to appeal to normative standards beyond those that are already implicit in the institutions of a market economy."

Hence, "the overall set of profit-maximizing strategies is partitioned into three categories, separating out the immoral and the illegal strategies from the normatively acceptable ones. The efficiency standard can be used to make both cuts. The 'acceptable/unacceptable' distinction is imposed by the efficiency properties of the market system as a whole. The set of unacceptable strategies can then be subdivided into 'immoral/illegal' using a transaction cost or regulatory cost analysis." In other words, the "basic thrust of 'business ethics' is […] to discourage firms from taking advantage of market imperfections, even in cases where legal regulation is not feasible."

Thus, "the firm should behave as though market conditions were perfectly competitive, even though they may not in fact be. The following list of imperatives provides some examples of the restrictions that this would imply :  
 Minimize negative externalities
 Compete only through price and quality
 Reduce information asymmetries between firm and customers
 Do not exploit diffusion of ownership
 Avoid erecting barriers to entry
 Do not use cross-subsidization to eliminate competitors
 Do not oppose regulation aimed at correcting market imperfections
 Do not seek tariffs or other protectionist measures
 Treat price levels as exogenously determined
 Do not engage in opportunistic behaviour toward customers or others firms"

"Public-economic" normative model of the welfare state

Heath advocates the "public-economic" normative model of the welfare state, that is to say a normative standard of the appropriate division of labor between the public and the private sector, as superior to the "redistributive" or "Communitarianism" models. According to Heath, the "public-economic" normative model "provides both the best theoretical reconstruction of the existing configuration of welfare state services, as well as the most useful set of principles to guide any proposed expansion or modification of these services".

Heath describes the three models as such : "The three normative purposes most commonly cited as providing a justification for the scope of welfare state activity are equality, community, or efficiency. These give rise to a corresponding set of models, which I refer to as the redistributive, the communitarian, and the public-economic models of the welfare state. The first sees the central function of the welfare state to be the redistribution of resources, with the goal of making the outcomes produced by the market economy less unequal. The second considers the central problem, central function of the welfare state to be that of imposing limits on the scope of the market, in order to resist the commodification of certain domains of interaction. The last model regards the welfare state as playing a role essentially complementary to that of the market. According to this view, the welfare state corrects market failure, either through regulation, subsidization and taxation, or the direct provision of goods and services."

Heath further explains the "public-economic" model this way : "The “classical liberal” state creates the market economy through the institution of property rights and civil contract. The “welfare state” then emerges in those areas where liberal markets fail to produce optimal outcomes. This can take the form of regulatory agencies (in cases where the rules of marketplace competition need to be adjusted), state-owned enterprises (typically in sectors where efficient competition cannot be organized), and public services (in cases where a system of effective property rights cannot be instituted, or where the transaction costs associated with a system of voluntary exchange would be prohibitive). According to this view, the welfare state essentially does the same thing as the market – both are in the business of enabling mutually beneficial forms of cooperation to emerge – it merely organizes the transactions under somewhat different terms. [...] The economic model of the welfare state should therefore be interpreted as the view that the state should strive to resolve collective action problems in cases where it can do so more efficiently than other institutional forms." Heath advances that this model has "considerable explanatory power" for these state activities : 1) control of natural monopolies, 2) control of imperfections in existing markets, 3) public provision, 4) the social safety net, 5) minority public goods and 6) governance failures.

Heath notes that "there is nothing incoherent about a hybrid “redistribution and public goods” view of the welfare state. However, the amount of actual egalitarian redistribution that goes on in a typical welfare state is often dramatically overestimated. This is because many theorists treat the social safety net, which is essentially a set of government-run insurance programs, as a system of redistribution, and hence as governed by an egalitarian logic."

Publications

Popular books
 Heath, Joseph The Efficient Society: Why Canada is as Close to Utopia as it Gets Viking, 2001.  
 Heath, Joseph & Potter, Andrew The Rebel Sell: Why the Culture Can't be Jammed Capstone, 2005.    
 Heath, Joseph Filthy Lucre: Economics for People Who Hate Capitalism HarperCollins, 2009.  . Also published under the title Economics Without Illusions: Debunking the Myths of Modern Capitalism Crown Publishing Group, 2010. 
 Heath, Joseph Enlightenment 2.0: Restoring Sanity to Our Politics, Our Economy, and Our Lives HarperCollins, 2014. 
 Heath, Joseph The Machinery of Government: Public Administration and the Liberal State Oxford University Press, 2020. 
 Heath, Joseph Cooperation and Social Justice University of Toronto Press, 2022.

Academic books
 Heath, Joseph Communicative Action and Rational Choice MIT, 2003.   
 Heath, Joseph Following the Rules: Practical Reasoning and Deontic Constraint Oxford University Press, 2008.   
 Heath, Joseph Morality, Competition, and The Firm: The Market Failures Approach to Business Ethics Oxford University Press, 2014. 
 Heath, Joseph Philosophical Foundations of Climate Change Policy Oxford University Press, 2021.

References

Sources
 Heath, Joseph (2014). Morality, Competition, and the Firm : The Market Failures Approach to Business Ethics. Oxford University Press.

External links
University of Toronto profile
Academia.edu profile
Video (with mp3 available) of conversation between Heath and Will Wilkinson on Bloggingheads.tv

1967 births
Living people
McGill University alumni
Northwestern University alumni
Academic staff of the University of Toronto
20th-century Canadian philosophers
21st-century Canadian philosophers